People's Republic of China competed at the 2013 World Aquatics Championships in Barcelona, Spain on July 20 to August 4, 2013.

Medalists

Diving

Chinese divers are eligible for two spots in each individual event (1 m, 3 m, and 10 m) and one team spot for each synchronized event (3 m and 10 m).

Men

Women

Open water swimming

China has qualified the following swimmers in open water marathon.

Men

Women

Mixed

Swimming

Chinese swimmers achieved qualifying standards in the following events (up to a maximum of 2 swimmers in each event at the A-standard entry time, and 1 at the B-standard): The official roster also featured Olympic champions Sun Yang, Ye Shiwen, and Jiao Liuyang.

Men

Women

Synchronized swimming

China has qualified the following synchronized swimmers.

Water polo

Men's tournament

Team roster

Ge Weiqing
Tan Feihu
Liang Zhongxing
Jiang Bin
Guo Junliang
Pan Ning
Li Bin
Wang Yang
Xie Junmin
Zhang Jian
Zhang Chufeng
Liang Nianxiang
Wu Honghui

Group play

Round of 16

Women's tournament

Team roster

Yang Jun
Teng Fei
Liu Ping
Sun Yujun
He Jin
Sun Yating
Song Donglun
Xu Lu
Mei Xiaohan
Ma Huanhuan
Zhang Cong
Xia Qun
Wang Ying

Group play

Round of 16

References

External links
CSA Official Site
Barcelona 2013 Official Site

Nations at the 2013 World Aquatics Championships
World Aquatics Championships
China at the World Aquatics Championships